Elliott Kavanagh (born 19 May 1993) is a former professional Australian rules footballer who played for the Essendon Football Club in the Australian Football League (AFL). He was recruited by the club in the 2011 National Draft, with pick 19. Kavanagh made his debut in round 18, 2012, against  at Docklands Stadium. He was delisted in October 2015.

References

External links

1993 births
Living people
Essendon Football Club players
Western Jets players
Australian rules footballers from Victoria (Australia)
Bendigo Football Club players